Melica spartinoides, is a species of grass in the family Poaceae that is endemic to the Brazilian state of Santa Catarina.

Description
The species is perennial and caespitose with short rhizomes. The species' leaf-sheaths are scabrous, tubular, keeled and are closed on one end with its ligule having eciliate membrane. The panicles have filiform and pubescent pedicels. The spikelets are solitary while it florets are diminished at the apex.

The glumes are different from each other. The lemma itself have ciliated margins with acute apex. It sterile florets are barren, cuneate, and grow in a clump. Flowers are fleshy, oblong, truncate, and have 3 anthers with 2 lodicules. Species' fruits are caryopsis, ellipsoid, and have an additional pericarp.

Ecology
It blooms only in February.

References

spartinoides
Endemic flora of Brazil
Flora of Santa Catarina (state)